Isleten is a village in the municipality of Isenthal, Uri, Switzerland.

Villages in Switzerland